Eikeland is a village in southeastern part of the municipality of Gjerstad in Agder, Norway. The Norwegian County Road 418 runs through the village.

The village area was originally centered on the old Eikeland ironworks factory along the river, but has since spread out to the east and the urban area of Eikeland now includes the neighboring village of Fiane.

References

Villages in Agder
Gjerstad